Jorge Liberato Urosa y Savino (28 August 1942 – 23 September 2021) was a Venezuelan prelate of the Catholic Church. He was auxiliary bishop of Caracas from 1982 to 1990, Archbishop of Valencia from 1990 to 2005, and Archbishop of Caracas from 2005 to 2018. He was made a cardinal in 2006.

Biography

Early life and ordination

Jorge Urosa was born in Caracas to Luis Manuel Urosa Joud and Ligia Savino del Castillo de Urosa. He studied humanities at Colegio De La Salle Tienda Honda, and philosophy at the Interdiocesan Seminary of Caracas. From 1962 to 1965, he studied theology at St. Augustine's Seminary in Toronto, Ontario, Canada.

Urosa then attended the Pontifical Gregorian University in Rome, where he obtained his doctorate in dogmatic theology, until 1971. During his time at the Gregorian, he returned to Caracas to be ordained to the priesthood by Cardinal José Quintero Parra on 15 August 1967.

Professor

After concluding his Roman studies at the Pius Latin American Pontifical College, Urosa served as a professor and the rector of the Seminary San José in Caracas. He later served as rector of the Interdiocesan Seminary in Caracas as well. Before becoming vicar general of the Archdiocese of Caracas, he was President of the Organization of Latin American Seminaries and founded a parochial vicariate in a chabolas neighborhood of Caracas.

Bishop

On 6 July 1982, Urosa was appointed Auxiliary Bishop of Caracas and Titular Bishop of Vegesela in Byzacena by Pope John Paul II. He received his episcopal consecration on the following 22 September from Archbishop José Lebrún Moratinos, with Archbishops Domingo Roa Pérez and Miguel Salas Salas CIM serving as co-consecrators. Urosa was named Archbishop of Valencia on 16 March 1990, and Archbishop of Caracas on 19 September 2005.

He was elected as the second Vice-President of the Venezuelan Episcopal Conference on 10 January 2006.

Cardinal

Pope Benedict XVI created him Cardinal-Priest of Santa Maria ai Monti in the consistory of 24 March 2006. Urosa was the fifth member of the College of Cardinals from Venezuela.

Besides his native Spanish, he spoke English, Italian, French, and Latin.

As of October 2011, he was the Honorary President of the Venezuelan Episcopal Conference.

He was one of the cardinal electors who participated in the 2013 papal conclave that elected Pope Francis.

Pope Francis accepted his resignation as archbishop on 9 July 2018.

Urosa rejected the creation of the Reformed Catholic Church in Venezuela, whose representatives were introduced in July 2008, as in line with the socialism of President Hugo Chávez. He called the group "an irregular association".

Urosa and his auxiliary bishops warned against using the mass for political purposes and declared that the mass at which a blessing was given to the President-elect of Paraguay, former bishop Fernando Lugo, was not authorized by the archdiocese.

Illness and death
On 27 August 2021, Urosa was admitted to a clinic in Caracas and diagnosed with COVID-19. He received the sacrament of the sick before being transferred to the intensive care unit and placed on a ventilator. On 3 September 2021, the Caracas archdiocese denied rumours circulating in the media that the cardinal had died but said the cardinal's health was in a delicate but stable condition and he was receiving all the necessary medical interventions in the intensive care ward. On 12 September, the archdiocese said the cardinal's health had deteriorated and he was in very delicate health. Cardinal Urosa died from the virus on 23 September 2021, after being hospitalized for a month.

References

External links 

 
 Cardinals of the Holy Roman Church
 Catholic-Hierarchy

1942 births
2021 deaths
Venezuelan cardinals
Cardinals created by Pope Benedict XVI
21st-century Roman Catholic archbishops in Venezuela
Pontifical Gregorian University alumni
Members of the Congregation for the Clergy
Roman Catholic archbishops of Caracas
Members of the Order of the Holy Sepulchre
Roman Catholic bishops of Caracas
Roman Catholic archbishops of Valencia en Venezuela
Deaths from the COVID-19 pandemic in Venezuela
Venezuelan Roman Catholic archbishops
Death in Caracas